The South Africa and Pakistan national cricket teams toured the United Arab Emirates (UAE) from 14 October to 15 November 2013. The tour included two Tests, five One Day Internationals (ODIs) and two Twenty20 Internationals (T20I)

Squads

Tour match

Pakistan A vs South Africans

United Arab Emirates vs Pakistanis

Test series

1st Test

Day 1
South African captain, Graeme Smith, who was playing his first Test after recovery from his ankle injury, won the toss and elected to bat first. Jacques Kallis was also playing his first Test since last February. Hashim Amla's partnerships of 61 runs for the fourth wicket with AB de Villiers (19), and 95 runs for the fifth with Jean-Paul Duminy (57) stopped the Pakistani bowlers who have ruined their top-order, with 43 for three. Zulfiqar Babar and Shan Masood – on his twenty-fourth birthday – made their Test debuts for Pakistan. Zulfiqar, a left arm spinner, was most successful taking three wickets for 89. Amla reached his twentieth century in 201 balls, and at the end of the day, he was unbeaten on 118, with South Africa on 245 for eight wickets.

Day 2
South Africa were restricted to 249 runs in 93.1 overs, and Mohammad Irfan finished with three wickets for 44 runs in 18.2 overs. Younus Khan equaled Javed Miandad's record for Pakistan taking his ninety-third catch in Test cricket; he caught Amla off the bowling of Irfan. Pakistan started their innings with a new opening pair – Khurram Manzoor and Masood – who put on a century partnership of 135 runs. This was the first century-stand from Pakistani openers since January. Masood started his innings with a boundary off Dale Steyn, and scored 75 runs on his debut, before given leg before wicket off Duminy's bowling. At the end of the second day, Manzoor was unbeaten on 131 runs, and Pakistan were 263 runs for three wickets.

Day 3
Manzoor scored 146 runs before falling to Philander; he surpassed Azhar Mahmood's 136 runs and became the highest run-scorer in a Test innings by a Pakistani batsman against South Africa. Misbah-ul-Haq scored 100 runs, his first century since May 2011, and fourth overall in Test cricket. Asad Shafiq added 54 runs, and Pakistan led by 193 in the first innings, scoring 442 runs. Philander took three wickets while conceding 84 runs in 26 overs. At the end of the day, South Africa were 72 for four wickets in 26 overs, with De Villiers on 10 and Steyn on zero.

Day 4
Nightwatchman, Steyn, was dismissed by Babar on seven. De Villiers, who scored his thirty-third half century in Test cricket, was South African second innings' top scorer, with 90 runs. His partnership of 57 runs with Robin Peterson prevented South Africa from an innings defeat; the latter scored 47 runs not out. South Africa took their total to 232 runs in 82.4 overs, this left Pakistan a target of only 40 runs. Saeed Ajmal took four wickets for 74 runs. Pakistan lost their first three wickets for seven runs while chasing the target. They achieved the target in the fourteenth over, with a six hit by Misbah over Peterson. This was Pakistan's fourth consecutive win against a world's no.1 Test team in the UAE; they remained unbeaten for the ninth consecutive time there. South Africa lost for the first time a Test since 2011, after 15 consecutive unbeaten matches. Adnan Akmal and Peterson were fined 50% of their match fee by the International Cricket Council (ICC), due to violation of "Article 2.2.4 of the ICC Code of Conduct for players and player support personnel".

2nd Test

ODI series

1st ODI

2nd ODI

3rd ODI

4th ODI

5th ODI

T20I series

1st T20I

2nd T20I

References

Broadcasting rights

External links 

Series page on Wisden India

2013 in Pakistani cricket
2013 in South African cricket
2013 in Emirati cricket
International cricket competitions in 2013–14
Pakistani cricket seasons from 2000–01
2013-14
South Africa 2013